Neale Fraser and Margaret duPont were the defending champions, but did not compete.

Ken Fletcher and Margaret Smith defeated Bob Hewitt and Darlene Hard in the final, 11–9, 6–4 to win the mixed doubles tennis title at the 1963 Wimbledon Championships.

Seeds

  Fred Stolle /  Lesley Turner (semifinals)
  Ken Fletcher /  Margaret Smith (champions)
  Dennis Ralston /  Ann Jones (semifinals)
  Bob Howe /  Maria Bueno (fourth round)

Draw

Finals

Top half

Section 1

Section 2

Section 3

Section 4

Bottom half

Section 5

Section 6

Section 7

Section 8

References

External links

X=Mixed Doubles
Wimbledon Championship by year – Mixed doubles